Bergur Ingi Pétursson (born October 3, 1985 in Reykjavík) is an Icelandic hammer thrower. Petursson represented Iceland at the 2008 Summer Olympics in Beijing, where he competed for the men's hammer throw. He performed the best throw of 71.63 metres on his third and final attempt, finishing twenty-fifth overall in the qualifying rounds.

References

External links

NBC Olympics Profile

Bergur Ingi Petursson
Male hammer throwers
Living people
Bergur Ingi Petursson
Athletes (track and field) at the 2008 Summer Olympics
1985 births
Bergur Ingi Petursson
Bergur Ingi Petursson